The 1920 Thornes Bridge was a timber Allan truss-type bridge that spanned the Mulwaree River between Goulburn, New South Wales, and Brisbane Grove, New South Wales. It was a rare example of a bridge of this type built after World War I. It was built in 1920 by J.J. McPhillips, and was designed by Percy Allan.

Description
Thornes Bridge was a timber Allan truss bridge,  in length.

Due to its significance to the region, the original bridge had been listed on the NSW State Heritage Register.

The bridge is no longer in use, having been superseded in 2002. It was progressively dismantled in 2013.

References

Road bridges in New South Wales
Allan truss bridges
Bridges designed by Percy Allan
Goulburn Mulwaree Council
Bridges completed in 1920
1920 establishments in Australia
2002 disestablishments in Australia
Demolished bridges in Australia